Alucita punctiferella is a moth in the family Alucitidae. It is found in Honduras.

References

Moths described in 1866
Alucitidae
Moths of Central America
Taxa named by Francis Walker (entomologist)